Attari Assembly constituency (Sl. No.: 20) is a Punjab Legislative Assembly constituency in Amritsar district, Punjab state, India.

Members of the Legislative Assembly

Election results

2022

2017

Previous results

See also
 List of constituencies of the Punjab Legislative Assembly
 Amritsar district

References

External links
  

Assembly constituencies of Punjab, India
Amritsar district